Balacra brunnea is a moth of the family Erebidae. It was described by Karl Grünberg in 1907. It is found in Cameroon.

References

Endemic fauna of Cameroon
Balacra
Moths described in 1907
Insects of Cameroon
Erebid moths of Africa